Massimo Scarpa (born 5 June 1970) is an Italian professional golfer.

Scarpa was born in Venice and turned professional at the end of 1992 having won the European Amateur. He played on the European Tour and the second tier Challenge Tour between 1993 and 2006. He won once on the European Tour and twice on the Challenge Tour. He also won the Italian National Omnium three times in four years between 1998 and 2001. He played on the Italian team in the 1999 Alfred Dunhill Cup at St Andrews, beating three-time major champion Payne Stewart in the second round less than a month before Stewart's death.

He is notable for playing golf both left- and right-handed.

Amateur wins
1992 European Amateur

Professional wins (6)

European Tour wins (1)

1Dual-ranking event with the Challenge Tour

Challenge Tour wins (3)

1Dual-ranking event with the European Tour

Other wins (3)
1998 Italian National Omnium
1999 Italian National Omnium
2001 Italian National Omnium

Team appearances
Amateur
European Youths' Team Championship (representing Italy): 1990 (winners)
Eisenhower Trophy (representing Italy): 1990, 1992
European Amateur Team Championship (representing Italy): 1991
St Andrews Trophy (representing the Continent of Europe): 1992

Professional
Alfred Dunhill Cup (representing Italy): 1999

References

External links

Italian male golfers
European Tour golfers
Sportspeople from Venice
1970 births
Living people